The Men's 5000 metres race of the 2016 World Single Distances Speed Skating Championships was held on 13 February 2016.

Results
The race was started at 15:00.

References

Men's 5000 metres